Svendborg Municipality is a municipality (kommune) in Region of Southern Denmark on the southeast coast of the island of Funen, as well as on the islands of Drejø, Hjortø, Skarø, Thurø, and Tåsinge off Funen's southeastern shores in south-central Denmark.  The municipality covers an area of 418 km², and has a total population of 59,193 (2022). Its mayor is Bo Hansen (2017), a member of the Social Democrats political party. The main town and the site of its municipal council is the city of Svendborg.

South of the municipality separating that part located on Funen from the other islands is Svendborg Strait (Svendborg Sund).

The 1,220-meter (4003-ft) long Svendborgsund Bridge (Svendborgsundbroen) connects the municipality at the city of Svendborg over the islands of Tåsinge and Siø, where the 774 meter (2540 ft) long Langeland Bridge (Langelandsbroen) continues to the city of Rudkøbing on the island of Langeland.  The Svendborgsund Bridge was opened in 1966.  The Langeland's Bridge was opened in 1962, and is Denmark's 10th longest bridge.

Ferry service connects the municipality at the town of Svendborg to the municipality's islands of Skarø, Drejø, and Hjortø, and to the town of Ærøskøbing on the island of Ærø.

On 1 January 2007 Svendborg municipality was, as the result of Kommunalreformen ("The Municipal Reform" of 2007), merged with Gudme and Egebjerg municipalities to form an enlarged Svendborg municipality.

Politics
Svendborg's municipal council consists of 29 members, elected every four years. The municipal council has seven political committees.

Municipal council
Below are the municipal councils elected since the Municipal Reform of 2007.

Locations
The ten largest urban areas in the municipality are:

Climate

References
 Municipal statistics: NetBorger Kommunefakta, delivered from KMD aka Kommunedata (Municipal Data)
 Municipal mergers and neighbors: Eniro new municipalities map

External links

 

 
Municipalities of the Region of Southern Denmark
Municipalities of Denmark
Populated places established in 2007